David Hunt (born 1 February 1991) is a South African competitive rower.

He competed at the 2016 Summer Olympics in Rio de Janeiro, in the men's coxless four. The South African team finished in 4th place.

References

1991 births
Living people
South African male rowers
Olympic rowers of South Africa
Rowers at the 2016 Summer Olympics
21st-century South African people